Pohorje, also known as the Pohorje Massif or the Pohorje Mountains (Bacherngebirge or often simply Bachern), is a mostly wooded, medium-high mountain range south of the Drava River in northeastern Slovenia. According to the traditional AVE classification it belongs to the Southern Limestone Alps. Geologically, it forms part of the Central Alps and features silicate metamorphic and igneous rock. Pohorje is sparsely populated with dispersed villages. There are also some ski resorts.

Geography 
Pohorje is an Alpine mountain ridge with domed summits south of the Drava. It roughly lies in the triangle formed by the towns of Maribor (to the east), Dravograd (to the west) and Slovenske Konjice (to the south). To the northwest, it is bounded by the Mislinja River, to the south by the Vitanje Lowlands, to the east it descends to the Drava Plain and to the southeast it descends to the Pohorje Foothills. Forests cover over 70% of its surface.

Geology 

Pohorje is a young mountain massif and is the southeasternmost part of the Central Alps. It is the only mountain chain in Slovenia made of silicate rock. Its peripheral parts consist of Paleozoic metamorphic rock, and its central parts of igneous rock, particularly granodiorite (known also as the Pohorje tonalite) and dacite.

Near the village of Cezlak lies probably the only known deposit of cizlakite (quartz monzogabbro; a green plutonic rock). The southern parts of Pohorje are known for white marble, which was quarried in Roman times.

Pohorje ski resorts
The following ski resorts stand at Pohorje:
 Rogla Ski Resort
 Kope–Ribnica Pohorje Ski Resort
 Maribor Pohorje Ski Resort
 Trije Kralji Ski Resort

Radio towers 
Near hilltops within the mountain range are located a TV and radio transmitter Pohorje and a military air-traffic control radar station RP-2.

References

External links 
 
 Pohorje. Tourist Information Centre Maribor.

 
Mountain ranges of the Alps
Mountain ranges of Slovenia
Southern Limestone Alps
Natura 2000 in Slovenia